Sebastijan Antić (born 5 November 1991) is a Croatian footballer who plays as a defender.

Career
On 7 August 2019 it was confirmed, that Antić had signed with FC Atyrau in Kazakhstan. However, due to problems with getting his players license, he left the club again and signed with HNK Orijent 1919 two weeks later.

In January 2020, Antic joined Sahab SC in Jordan. On 30 September 2020 SILA, a law company, confirmed that FIFA condemned the club to pay to the player outstanding remuneration and compensation for breach of contract.. On 18 September 2020, he joined Al-Mesaimeer SC in Qatar.

Honours

Club
Al-Quwa Al-Jawiya
AFC Cup 
 Champions (1): 2017

References

External links

 Sebastijan Antić Interview

1991 births
Living people
Footballers from Rijeka
Association football defenders
Croatian footballers
NK Crikvenica players
NK Krk players
NK Pomorac 1921 players
NK Zavrč players
Al-Wehdat SC players
Al-Quwa Al-Jawiya players
HNK Orijent players
Sahab SC players
Mesaimeer SC players
Al-Mina'a SC players
Croatian Football League players
First Football League (Croatia) players
Slovenian PrvaLiga players
Qatari Second Division players
AFC Cup winning players
Croatian expatriate footballers
Expatriate footballers in Slovenia
Expatriate footballers in Jordan
Expatriate footballers in Iraq
Expatriate footballers in Qatar
Expatriate footballers in Libya
Croatian expatriate sportspeople in Slovenia
Croatian expatriate sportspeople in Jordan
Croatian expatriate sportspeople in Iraq
Croatian expatriate sportspeople in Qatar
Croatian expatriate sportspeople in Libya